Tabanus calens is a species of horse fly in the family Tabanidae.

Distribution
Canada, United States.

Subspecies
These two subspecies belong to the species Tabanus calens:
 Tabanus calens calens Linnaeus, 1758
 Tabanus calens giganteus De Geer, 1776

References

Tabanidae
Flies described in 1758
Taxa named by Carl Linnaeus
Diptera of North America